This article shows all participating team squads at the 2006 Women's Pan-American Volleyball Cup, held from June 27 to July 8, 2006 in San Juan, Puerto Rico.

Head coach: Carlos Di Leonardo

Head coach: Naoki Miyashita

Head coach: Eugenio George

Head coach: Beato Miguel Cruz

Head coach: Marco Heredia

Head coach: Carlos Aparicio

Head coach: Juan Carlos Núñez

Head coach: Lang Ping

References
NORCECA
ARG Federation (Archived 2009-05-16)
FMVB (Archived 2009-05-16)
Volleyball Canada
USA Volleyball
PUR Volley Fed (Archived 2009-05-16)

S
P